The New York Attorney General election of 2010 took place on November 2, 2010 to elect the Attorney General of New York. Democratic nominee Eric Schneiderman defeated Republican nominee Dan Donovan. Previous Democratic Attorney General Andrew Cuomo vacated the office following his run for governor.

Democratic primary

Candidates
 Richard Brodsky, State Assemblyman
 Sean Coffey, former Assistant United States Attorney
 Eric R. Dinallo, former New York Superintendent of Insurance
 Kathleen Rice, Nassau County District Attorney
 Eric Schneiderman, State Senator

Results

Republican primary

Candidates
 Robert Antonacci, Onondaga County Comptroller
 Daniel M. Donovan, Jr., Richmond County District Attorney

Results

Independence Party
 Stephen Lynch, attorney

Freedom Party
 Ramon J. Jimenez

Libertarian Party
 Carl Person, attorney

General election

Results

References

External links

Attorney General
2010
New York